Kanneer Pookkal is a 1981 Indian Tamil-language film written and directed by Rajasekhar. The film stars Vijayan and Sripriya, with Anand, Anumanthu, Vijay Babu, Manorama, Pandari Bai, Rohini and Roopa in supporting roles. Based on the novel Aayul Thandanai by Sivasankari, it was released on 10 April 1981.

Plot

Cast 
Vijayan
Sripriya
Anand
Anumanthu
Vijay Babu
Manorama
Pandari Bai
Rohini
Roopa

Production 
Kanneer Pookkal is not based the novel of the same name by Mu. Metha, but Aayul Thandanai by Sivasankari. Cinematography was handled by V. Ranga and editing by M. Vellaichamy.

Soundtrack 
The music was composed by Shankar–Ganesh. The song "Maadi Veettu Mama" attained popularity.

Reception 
Nalini Sastry of Kalki praised the performances of Vijayan and Sripriya and Ranga's cinematography. She concluded the review by saying the film is not a life sentence for us, however the praise is for Sivashankari.

References

External links 
 

1980s Tamil-language films
1981 films
Films based on Indian novels
Films directed by Rajasekhar (director)
Films scored by Shankar–Ganesh